Blizzard T. Husky is the costumed mascot of the Michigan Tech Huskies.  Michigan Technological University is a top-rated science and technology university located in Upper Michigan's Keweenaw Peninsula.

Blizzard was christened via a campus-wide competition on January 31, 1997.  The "T" in his name stands for "The."

Blizzard appears at Michigan Tech's home sporting events as well as other university and community functions.  He is often seen skating in the hockey arena before and during home games and participating in various other activities. His jersey number is "85" in recognition of the year Michigan Tech was founded (1885).  
Blizzard appeared at the 41st Annual GLI (Great Lakes Invitational) hockey tournament held at the Joe Louis Arena in Detroit, Michigan, along with fellow mascots Sparty (Michigan State University) and Joe College (the GLI Tournament).  Blizzard returned this year for the 42nd Annual GLI as well.

Blizzard also travels the United States. In November 2010, Blizzard was the first mascot to visit the Kennedy Space Center. While he was there he experienced a gravity-force simulator, walked on the beach, and shopped in Ron Jon’s famous Surf Shop in Cocoa Beach, Florida.

In August 2010, Blizzard helped McGruff the Crime Dog teach about crime prevention, and in November 2010, Blizzard visited Knightro, the University of Central Florida’s mascot.

External links
Blizzard T. Husky Page

References
Blizzard Press Release

College mascots in the United States
Michigan Technological University